This list is of the archaeological sites of the Taklamakan Desert and Lop Desert in China.

Sites

See also
 International Dunhuang Project

References

External links
 IDP Site Information

Archaeological sites in China
Archaeological sites